In his 2007 book On Nuclear Terrorism, author Michael A. Levi surveys the issue of nuclear terrorism and explores the decisions a terrorist leader might take in pursuing a nuclear plot. Levi points out the many obstacles that such a terrorist scheme may encounter, which in turn leads to a host of possible ways that any terrorist plan could be foiled.

Professor John Mueller's 2010 book Atomic Obsession: Nuclear Alarmism From Hiroshima to Al-Qaeda is an expansion of the same theme.

Michael Levi is a senior fellow for energy and environment at the Council on Foreign Relations, New York.

See also
 List of books about nuclear issues

References

Further reading

External links
Book Launch: On Nuclear Terrorism

2007 non-fiction books
American political books
Books about nuclear issues
Books about terrorism
Harvard University Press books
Nuclear terrorism